"Life Is a Rock (But the Radio Rolled Me)" is a 1974 song written by Norman Dolph (lyrics) and Paul DiFranco (music). It was recorded by an ad hoc group of studio musicians called Reunion, with Joey Levine as lead singer. The lyrics are a fast patter of 1950s, 1960s, and 1970s disc jockeys, musicians, songwriters, record labels, song titles and lyrics, broken only by the chorus. Levine had previously been lead singer and co-writer of bubblegum music hits "Yummy Yummy Yummy" and "Chewy Chewy" by the Ohio Express. "Life Is a Rock" peaked at No. 8 on the Billboard Hot 100 chart and reached No. 33 on the UK Singles Chart.

The song's outro quotes "Baby I Need Your Loving" by The Four Tops, "Celebrate" by Three Dog Night, "I Want to Take You Higher" by Sly and the Family Stone, and "Uptight (Everything's Alright)" by Stevie Wonder.

The track was later covered by Tracey Ullman in 1983, and was featured in her 1984 album, You Broke My Heart in 17 Places.

Chart performance

Weekly charts

Year-end charts

Covers
The song was remade by Randy Crenshaw and released on 2001 Disney album Mickey's Dance Party under the name "Life Is a Rock (But the Radio Rolled Me...Again!)"  The remake includes references not only to current and past music groups, but also to TV shows and internet slang, and some Disney characters.

A customized version of the song: "Life Is a Rock, but 'CFL Rolled Me" was the last rock and roll song played on the Larry Lujack show on WCFL in Chicago on March 15, 1976, before the station switched from Top 40 to beautiful music format. Rival AM station WLS had their own rendition: "Life Is a Rock, WLS Rolled Me". This was the first song played on WLS-FM when the famous callsign returned to the station in 2008, airing a classic hits format. In 1974, radio station KFRC in San Francisco also aired a specially tailored take on the song: "Life Is a Rock, but KFRC Rolled Me" with an extra verse naming all of the station's then-current personalities. The verse was sung by KFRC's afternoon personality, Chuck Buell.  980, WRC in Washington, DC also had a personalized version that was played on the air (this actually was common among the big Top 40 AMs of the day with special copies cut for their station).

Tracey Ullman recorded a cover that was included on her first album You Broke My Heart in 17 Places in 1983.

In 1988 McDonald's produced a jingle heavily influenced by the song for its "$1,000,000 Menu Song" promotion. The McDonald's recording, with an identical melody and a rapidly spoken list of menu offerings recited in an identical monotone pitch and rhythm, was released as a mass giveaway in the form of a 33-1/3 RPM flexible plastic single.)

Name checks

 B. Bumble and the Stingers
 Mott the Hoople
 Ray Charles Singers
 Lonnie Mack
 Twangin' Eddy
 "Here's my ring, we're going steady"
 "Take It Easy"
 "I Want to Take You Higher"
 "Liar, Liar"
 "The Loco-Motion"
 Poco
 Deep Purple
 "(I Can't Get No) Satisfaction"
 Sam Cooke
 Lesley Gore
 Ritchie Valens
 Mahavishnu Orchestra
 "Fujiyama"
 Kama Sutra
 "Rama Lama Ding Dong"
 Richard Perry
 Phil Spector
 Jeff Barry
 The Righteous Brothers
 The Archies
 Harry Nilsson
 "Shimmy, Shimmy, Ko Ko Bop"
 Fats Is Back
 "Finger Poppin' Time"
 Friends and Romans
 Brenda & the Tabulations
 Carly Simon
 Noddy Holder
 Rolling Stone
 Johnny Cash
 Johnny Rivers
 Mungo Jerry
 Peter, Paul and Mary
 "Mary, Mary"
 Dr. John
 Doris Day
 Jack the Ripper
 Leon Russell
 Shelter Records
 "Gimme Shelter"
 Smokey Robinson and the Miracles
 Slide guitar
 Fender bass
 Bonnie Bramlett
 Wilson Pickett
 Arthur Janov
 The Primal Scream
 Screamin' Jay Hawkins
 Dale Hawkins
 Ronnie Hawkins
 Kukla, Fran and Ollie
 Norman, Oklahoma
 John Denver
 Donny Osmond
 J. J. Cale
 ZZ Top
 L.L. Bean
 "DeDe Dinah"
 David Bowie
 Steely Dan
 "CC Rider"
 Edgar Winter
 Joanie Sommers
 Osmond Brothers
 Johnny Thunders
 Eric Clapton
 Wah-wah pedal
 Stephen Foster
 "Camptown Races"
 "Good Vibrations"
 "Help Me Rhonda"
 "Surfer Girl"
 "Little Honda"
 "Tighter, Tighter"
 "Honey, Honey"
 "Sugar, Sugar"
 "Yummy Yummy Yummy"
 CBS
 Warner Bros.
 RCA ("...and all the others")
 "Remember (Walking in the Sand)"
 Rock 'em Sock 'em Robots
 Alan Freed
 Murray the K
 The Fish
 The Swim
 "The Boston Monkey"

The 45-rpm single version fades out here. The extended album version continues, with the following references:

 Freddie King
 Albert King
 B.B. King
 Felix Pappalardi
 Laurel and Hardy
 Randy Newman
 Aretha Franklin
 Tito Puente
 Boffalongo
 Cuba
 War
 California
 Beatlemania
 New York City
 Transylvania
 S&G
 Bobby Vee
 SRO
 Conway Twitty
 "Do Wah Diddy Diddy"

Performed as medley or spoken over the fade-out:
 "Baby I Need Your Loving" by The Four Tops
 "Uptight (Everything's Alright)" by Stevie Wonder
 "Celebrate" by Three Dog Night
 "I Want to Take You Higher" by Sly & the Family Stone

See also
List of 1970s one-hit wonders in the United States

References

External links
 Lyrics of this song
 

1974 singles
1974 songs
RCA Victor singles
List songs
Patter songs
Songs about rock music
Songs about radio
Joey Levine songs
Songs written by Joey Levine
Novelty songs